Mariano is a masculine name from the Romance languages, corresponding to the feminine Mariana.

It is an Italian, Spanish and Portuguese variant of the Roman Marianus which derived from Marius, and Marius derived from the Roman god Mars (see also Ares) or from the Latin maris "male".

Mariano and Marian are sometimes seen as a conjunction of the two female names Mary and Ann. This name is an homage to The Virgin Mary, Mother of Jesus.

Mariano, as a surname, is of Italian, Spanish and Portuguese origin from the personal name Mariano, from the Latin family name Marianus (a derivative of the ancient personal name Marius, of Etruscan origin). In the early Christian era it came to be taken as an adjective derived from Maria, and was associated with the cult of the Virgin Mary. It was borne by various early saints, including a 3rd-century martyr in Numibia and a 5th-century hermit of Berry, France. It is also a Sephardic Jewish surname derived from the term Merano.

First name 

 Mariano Armellino (1657–1737), Italian Benedictine historian
 Mariano Azuela, Mexican writer
 Mariano Baracetti, Argentine beach volleyball player
 Mariano Duncan, baseball player and coach
 Mariano Egaña, Chilean lawyer and politician
 Mariano Fernández Bermejo (born 1948), Spanish jurist and politician
 Mariano Ferreira Filho (born 1986), Brazilian footballer
 Mariano Frumboli, Argentine tango dancer
 Mariano González, Argentine footballer
 Mariano Grondona, Argentine journalist
 Mariano Hoyas, Spanish footballer
 Mariano Iberico Rodríguez, Peruvian philosopher
 Mariano Martínez, Argentine actor and model
 Mariano Marquez, Puerto Rican boxer
 Mariano Díaz Mejía, Dominican football player
 Mariano Moreno, Argentine national hero
 Mariano Mores, Argentine tango pianist and composer
 Mariano Ponce, Filipino physician and member of the Propaganda Movement
 Mariano Rampolla, Italian cardinal
 Mariano Rivera, baseball player
 Mariano Rajoy, Spanish politician, Prime Minister (2011-2018)
 Mariano Rubio, Spanish economist 
 Mariano Navarro Rubio, Spanish politician
 Mariano Scartezzini, Italian long-distance runner
 Mariano Torres, Argentine footballer
 Mariano Trías, Filipino vice president of the brief Republic of Biak-na-Bato
 Mariano Trípodi, Argentine footballer
 Mariano Vallejo, Californian politician, military commander, and rancher
 Mariano Zabaleta, Argentine tennis player
 Mariano Di Vaio, Italian fashion blogger

Surname
Michael Mariano, legendary Somali politician
Charlie Mariano, American jazz musician
Amber Mariano, American television personality
Ayra Mariano, Filipina-American actress, singer, dancer, host and model
Belle Mariano, Filipina actress, model and singer
Bob Mariano, American corporate executive
Eleanor Concepcion Mariano, also known as Connie Mariano, former White House physician
Jarah Mariano, American model
Jess Mariano, a fictional character from Gilmore Girls
Guy Mariano, professional skateboarder
Lucas Mariano (born 1993), Brazilian basketball player
Luis Mariano, Spanish-French singer
Mariano (footballer, born 1975), Portuguese footballer, full name Carlos Alberto Teixeira Mariano
Otacílio Mariano Neto (born 1982), Brazilian footballer
Nelson Mariano, chess grandmaster
Rob Mariano, American television personality
Sivan Mariano, contestant on cycle 1 of Israel's Next Top Model
Ian Mariano, a Guamanian international footballer

See also
Marianopolis College, often nicknamed Mariano

References

Italian masculine given names
Spanish masculine given names
Italian-language surnames
Spanish-language surnames
Sephardic surnames